Izuna may refer to:

The Japanese name for the least weasel and its subspecies
Mount Izuna in Japan
The Izuna Shugen, a cult which originated on this mountain, which worships a god in the form of a tengu named Izuna Gongen
A fox-sorcery practice which is part of this cult, which utilizes creatures such as the kuda-gitsune
Izuna: Legend of the Unemployed Ninja, a Nintendo DS game
Izuna 2: The Unemployed Ninja Returns, sequel to the above game
Izuna, a character from the Guilty Gear series of video games
Izuna Uchiha, the deceased younger brother of Madara Uchiha from Naruto
Izuna Hatsuse, an 8 year old purple haired Werebeast girl from No Game No Life